Renato Bodini (October 1, 1909 in Cremona – August 23, 1974 in Rome) was an Italian professional football player and coach.

He played for 11 seasons (270 games, 18 goals) in the Serie A for U.S. Cremonese, A.S. Roma, Sampierdarenese, A.C. Milan and A.C. Liguria.

He became first-team regular in his first season for A.S. Roma despite his young age. His first league goal for Roma was an 88th-minute equalizer against S.S. Lazio in a Derby della Capitale game.

His older brother Ercole Bodini also played football professionally. To distinguish them, Ercole was referred to as Bodini I and Renato as Bodini II.

1909 births
1974 deaths
Italian footballers
Serie A players
Serie B players
U.S. Cremonese players
A.S. Roma players
U.C. Sampdoria players
A.C. Milan players
S.S.D. Lucchese 1905 players
Italian football managers
Piacenza Calcio 1919 managers
Mantova 1911 managers
U.S. Cremonese managers
A.C.N. Siena 1904 managers
Reggina 1914 managers
A.S. Acireale managers
Association football defenders